The Riga Speedway Stadium or the Biķernieki Speedway Stadium is a multi-use stadium in the Eastern part of Riga, Latvia.  The stadium is the venue for the 2023 World Championship round known as the Speedway Grand Prix of Latvia and the Team Speedway Under-21 World Championship.

The speedway track which is adjacent to the Biķernieki Complex Sports Base was first constructed in 1976 and held several editions of the Soviet Union Speedway Championship before falling into disrepair. However, in 2014 the track was renovated and has even hosted a drift race car meeting that normally tales place on the larger adjacent circuit.

See also 
Speedway Grand Prix of Latvia

References

Sport in Riga
Buildings and structures in Riga
Speedway venues in Latvia